Henshaw is a small village and civil parish in Northumberland, within the vicinity of the ancient Hadrian's Wall.

Nearby landmarks include Allen Banks & Staward Gorge, Sycamore Gap, The Sill: National Landscape Discovery Centre and Vindolanda Roman Fort.

Demography 
The data below shows that 50.7% of the population in Henshaw (Parish) are male, and 49.3% are female. This compares similarly with that of the national average, as well as the average within the county of Northumberland.

A total of 0.1% of the population were from a black, Asian and minority ethnic (BAME) group in Henshaw (Parish). This figure is significantly lower than that of the average in Northumberland , as well as the national average .

Data from the Office for National Statistics found that the average life expectancy in the Haydon and Hadrian electoral ward is 81.9 years for men, and 85.4 years for women. These statistics compare very favourably, when compared to the average life expectancy in the North East of England, of 77.4 and 81.4 years, for men and women respectively.

Car ownership is very high in Henshaw (Parish), with a total of 92.1% households having access to at least one car. This is significantly higher than the average within Northumberland , as well as the national average .

Education 
Henshaw Church of England First School serves the village, providing education for students aged between 4 and 11 years old. The nearby Haltwhistle Academy provides education for students aged between 3 and 11 years old.

In terms of secondary education, Haydon Bridge High School provides secondary education for students aged between 11 and 16 years old, as well as post-16 study.

Governance 
Haydon and Hadrian is a local council ward in the county of Northumberland.

, the Haydon and Hadrian ward is served by Liberal Democrats councillor, Alan Sharp.

The village is located within the parliamentary constituency of Hexham, and is served by Conservative Party Member of Parliament (MP), Guy Opperman.

Transport

Air

Bus
The village is served by Arriva North East and Stagecoach Cumbria & North Lancashire's 685 bus service, which provides one bus per hour linking Carlisle, Brampton and Haltwhistle with Hexham, Corbridge and Newcastle.

Rail
The nearest National Rail station is located at Bardon Mill, which serves the Tyne Valley Line. Northern Trains provide 11 trains per day from Bardon Mill to Carlisle, and 13 trains per day to Hexham and Newcastle.

Road

See also 
Bardon Mill
Haltwhistle
Melkridge

References

External links

 

Villages in Northumberland